The sixth and most recent HMS Valiant was the second of Britain's nuclear-powered submarines, and the first of the two-unit .

Construction
She was ordered on 31 August 1960 and laid down 22 January 1962 at Vickers-Armstrongs in Barrow-in-Furness. The basic design concept was to use the forward design of Dreadnought together with an aft end consisting of all British nuclear machinery based on the Dounreay prototype.

She was launched on 3 December 1963 by Lady Thorneycroft, and finally entered service 18 July 1966.

Operational history

She was refitted in 1970, 1977 and 1989. 

In 1977 Valiant was trailing a Soviet submarine in the eastern Mediterranean when she suffered a salt water pipe leak, which flooded the reactor compartment with sea water. The reactor was shut down and the compartment pumped dry and after a clean-up of the compartment, the reactor was taken under power again. Valiant took part in the Falklands War in 1982, arriving in the war zone on 17 May. She transmitted more than 300 early air-warning alerts and spent 101 days on patrol off Argentina's Patagonian coast. Valiant suffered minor damage while submerged when an Argentine aircraft coming back from a mission jettisoned its bombs near the submarine. 

In November 2010, it was reported in Hansard that Valiant had run aground in the North Norwegian Sea in March 1991.

Following the development of engine trouble  in June 1994, she was paid off on 12 August 1994.

Her hull and reactor are currently laid up afloat at Devonport Dockyard, Plymouth, Devon, until facilities are available for the long term storage of her radioactive components.

Courageous was selected for the museum ship to represent the SSN fleet of the Royal Navy during the Cold War. Components were removed from Valiant to restore Courageous.

References

Bibiliography

 

Valiant-class submarines
Falklands War naval ships of the United Kingdom
Maritime incidents in 1982
1963 ships
Cold War submarines of the United Kingdom